Cotys I or Kotys I may refer to:

Kings of Thrace
 Cotys I (Odrysian), ruled 384–360 BC
 Cotys I (Sapaean), ruled until 48 BC

Other
 Tiberius Julius Cotys I (fl. 1st century), prince and Roman Client King of the Bosporan Kingdom

See also
Kotys, Thracian goddess